Communications in Information Literacy is a biannual peer-reviewed open access academic journal covering the area of information literacy in higher education. It was established in 2007 and the editors-in-chief are Stewart Brower (University of Oklahoma), Christopher V. Hollister (University at Buffalo), and Robert Schroeder (Portland State University).

Abstracting and indexing
The journal is abstracted and indexed in EBSCO databases, ERIC, Emerging Sources Citation Index, Information Science & Technology Abstracts, Library and Information Science Abstracts, ProQuest databases, and Scopus.

References

External links

Library science journals
Information science journals
Biannual journals
Creative Commons-licensed journals
Publications established in 2007
English-language journals